Kord Mahalleh (also Romanized as Kord Maḩalleh) is a village in Lafmejan Rural District, in the Central District of Lahijan County, Gilan Province, Iran. At the 2006 census, its population was 94, in 25 families.

References 

Populated places in Lahijan County